Albuca abyssinica (syn. Albuca melleri), known in Tanzania by the common names koyosa and kitunguu pori, is a species of flowering plant in the family Asparagaceae,  native to tropical regions in Africa. The flowers grow terminal racemes 20 – 30 cm long with the plant achieving heights between 60 and 100 cm. Its bulb has been used to treat inflammation and for dressing wounds.

References

abyssinica
Flora of Zimbabwe
Plants described in 1783